The mesites (Mesitornithidae) are a family of birds that are part of a clade (Columbimorphae) that include Columbiformes and Pterocliformes. They are smallish flightless or near flightless birds endemic to Madagascar. They are the only family with more than two species in which every species is threatened (all three are listed as vulnerable).

Description 
The mesites are forest and scrubland birds that feed on insects and seeds. The brown and white-breasted mesites forage on the ground, gleaning insects from the leaves and under them, as well as low vegetation. The subdesert mesite uses its long bill to probe in the soil. Other birds, such as drongos and flycatchers, will follow mesites to catch any insects they flush and miss. Mesites are vocal birds, with calls similar to passerine song, used for territorial defence. Two or three white eggs are laid in a stick-nest located in a bush or low branch. The Mesitornis species are monogamous while Monias benschi is polygamous and unlike the other two shows significant sexual dichromatism.

Systematics 

There are two genera, Mesitornis (2 species) and Monias (subdesert mesite).

Historically, mesites’ phylogenetic relationships were not very clear; they have been allied with the Gruiformes, Turniciformes and Columbiformes.

Recent phylogenomic studies support Pterocliformes (sandgrouse) as the sister group of mesites while some more recent studies place this clade with another clade constituted of Columbiformes and Cuculiformes (cuckoos).

References

 
Taxa named by Alexander Wetmore
Endemic birds of Madagascar